Winchite is a mineral in the amphibole group.

Name 
The mineral is named after Howard James Winch, who was the one discovered it in Madhya Pradesh, India. Sir Lewis Fermor was the one who named the mineral.

Winchite is also called Aluminowinchite or Eckrite.

Chemistry 
Winchite has a chemical composition similar to tremolite. But it contains iron, potassium, sodium, and manganese.

Occurrence 
Winchite occurs on grains of riebeckite. It can be found in schist with metamorphosed manganese deposits.

Distribution 
It has been found on the south eastern part of Anglesey. It has been found in Kajlidongri mine located in India as well at Ward creek in California.

References 

Monoclinic minerals
Amphibole group
Calcium minerals
Sodium minerals